Babyshoe Falls drops , with a main drop of , in Babyshoe Pass. It is located in the Midway High Lakes Area northwest of Mount Adams, in the Gifford Pinchot National Forest of Washington state. The falls are seasonal, typically drying up in the summer, but starting to flow again after periods of prolonged rainfall or snow melt.

Sources
 http://www.waterfallsnorthwest.com/nws/waterfall.php?st=&num=746

Landforms of Skamania County, Washington
Waterfalls of Washington (state)
Mount Adams (Washington)
Gifford Pinchot National Forest
Midway High Lakes Area
Tiered waterfalls
Horsetail waterfalls
Waterfalls of Skamania County, Washington